The Skull Chapel or St. Bartholomew's Church, is an ossuary chapel located in the Czermna district of Kudowa-Zdrój, Poland. Built in Baroque style in the last quarter of the 18th century, the temple serves as a mass grave with thousands of skulls and skeletal remains adorning its interior walls as well as floor, ceiling and foundations. The Skull Chapel is the only such monument in Poland, and one of six in Europe.

History
The chapel was built in 1776 by Bohemian local parish priest Václav Tomášek. It is the mass grave of people who died during the Thirty Years’ War (1618–1648), three Silesian Wars (1740–1763), as well as of people who died because of cholera epidemics, plague, syphilis and hunger.

Together with sacristan J. Schmidt and grave digger J. Langer, father Tomášek who was inspired by the Capuchin cemetery while on a pilgrimage to Rome, collected the casualties’ bones, cleaned and put them in the chapel within 18 years (from 1776 to 1794). Walls of this small, baroque church are filled with three thousand skulls, and there are also bones of another 21 thousand people interred in the basement. The skulls of people who built the chapel, including Tomášek, were placed in the center of the building and on the altar in 1804. Inside are a crucifix and two carvings of angels with Latin inscriptions that read "arise from the dead" and "come to judgment". A recording inside the church available in three languages (Polish, Czech and German) explains the history of the chapel.

Gallery

See also
Sedlec Ossuary
Santa Maria della Concezione dei Cappuccini
Capela dos Ossos

References

External links

Roman Catholic churches completed in 1776
Roman Catholic chapels in Poland
Kłodzko County
Ossuaries
Baroque church buildings in Poland
Churches in Lower Silesian Voivodeship
Visionary environments
18th-century Roman Catholic church buildings in Poland